Horde3D is an open-source cross-platform graphics engine. Its purpose and design is similar to that of OGRE with the primary goal being lightweight for next-generation video games. The engine is also particularly suited for large crowd simulations. The engine is also compatible with GLFW. The major part of the graphics engine was originally written for the indie group pyropix and development is now continued at the University of Augsburg.

Design 
The engine is primarily designed for an object-oriented approach to scene rendering. It also features a Scene Editor that can design shaders with support for plugins including physics. The engine was originally built on top of OpenGL 2.0 A plugin to use the engine with the Bullet Physics API also exists.

Languages 
The engine contains a number of bindings to various languages including C#, Java, Python, Lua, Squirrel, GML (GMHorde3D)

Games using the engine 
The following commercial games use the Horde3D engine:

References

External links 
 
 
 
 

Game engines for Linux
IPhone video game engines
Mono project applications
Video game engines